Giannis Sentementes (born 15 June 1992) is a Greek footballer who plays for Panachaiki in the Football League (Greece) as a defender .

References
 Guardian Football

1992 births
Living people
Super League Greece players
Football League (Greece) players
Asteras Tripolis F.C. players
Veria F.C. players
Panachaiki F.C. players
Association football defenders
Footballers from Athens
Greek footballers